The 1995 Division 1 season was the 30th of the competition of the first-tier football in Senegal. The tournament was organized by the Senegalese Football Federation.  The season began in January and finished on 6 August 1995. ASC Diaraf won the eight title and participated in the 1996 African Cup of Champions Clubs the following year. AS Douanes participated in the 1996 CAF Cup, Entente Sotrac Ouakam in the 1996 CAF Winners' Cup and ASEC Ndiambour in the 1996 West African Cup.

ASEC Ndiambour was the defending team of the title. A total of 18 clubs participated in the competition (9 in each of the two groups, Group A and B), it would be the first time the group system would be used along with the playoff system with two matches in the semis and one in the final. The two leading teams succeeded to the playoff round.  The season featured 289 matches and scored 199 goals. ASC Diamono and Entente Réveil Guet-Ndarou Mool came from the second division (Division 2).

Participating clubs

 Espoirs de Bignona
 US Gorée
 Compagnie sucrière sénégalaise (Senegalese Sugar Company)
 ASC Port Autonome
 Sodefitex
 AS Douanes
 ASC Jeanne d'Arc
 ASFA Dakar
 Entente Sotrak Ouakam

 Entente Réveil Guet-Ndarou Mool
 ASC Diamono
 ASC Diaraf
 Stade de Mbour
 US Rail
 ASC Linguère
 ETICS Mboro
 SONACOS
 ASEC Ndiambour

Overview
The league was contested by 18 teams (9 in Group A, 9 in Group B) with ASC Diaraf winning the championship.  Due to an undetermined reason, ASC Jeanne d'Arc did not relegated.

League standings

Group A

Group B

Final stages

Semi-finals

Final

Footnotes

External links
Historic results at rsssf.com

Senegal
Senegal Premier League seasons